The football (soccer) Campeonato Brasileiro Série B 1995, the second level of Brazilian National League, was held from August 13 to December 16, 1995. The competition had 24 clubs and two of them were promoted to Série A and two were relegated to Série C. The competition was won by Atlético-PR.

Atlético-PR finished the final phase group with the most points, and was declared 1995 Brazilian Série B champions, claiming the promotion to the 1996 Série A along with Coritiba, the runners-up. The two worst ranked teams (Ponte Preta and Democrata) were originally relegated to play Série C in 1996. However, after Barra do Garças withdrew from the competition in 1996, Ponte Preta's relegation was cancelled.

Teams

First phase

Group A

Group B

Group C

Group D

Second phase

Group E

Group F

Group G

Group H

Third phase

Group I

Group J

Final phase

Sources

Campeonato Brasileiro Série B seasons
1995 in Brazilian football leagues